Geoffrey Broadbent Edge (17 August 1911 – 31 May 1996) was an English cricketer.  Edge was a left-handed batsman who fielded as a wicket-keeper.  He was born at Wimbledon, Surrey.

Edge made his debut in county cricket for Staffordshire against Northumberland in the 1937 Minor Counties Championship.  He played Minor counties cricket for Staffordshire in 1937 and 1939, making a total of seven appearances, the last of which came against Durham.  While in the British Raj during World War II, Edge made a single first-class appearance for the Europeans against the Indians in the 1942/43 Madras Presidency Match.  The Indians won the toss and elected to bat first, making 268 all out.  In their first-innings, the Europeans made 242 all out, with Edge, who opened the batting, making 4 runs before being dismissed by C. R. Rangachari.  In their second-innings, the Indians were dismissed for 117, leaving the Europeans to chase 144 to win.  Once again opening the batting, Edge shared in a 51 run opening stand for the first wicket with C. P. Johnstone, before Edge was dismissed for 31 by T. S. Parankusam.  The Europeans went on to win the match by 8 wickets.

He died at Stockport, Cheshire, on 31 May 1996.

References

External links
Geoffrey Edge at ESPNcricinfo
Geoffrey Edge at CricketArchive

1911 births
1996 deaths
People from Wimbledon, London
English cricketers
Staffordshire cricketers
Europeans cricketers
Wicket-keepers